The 1973 All-Pacific-8 Conference football team consists of American football players chosen by various organizations for All-Pacific-8 Conference teams for the 1973 NCAA Division I football season.

Offensive selections

Quarterbacks
 Mike Boryla, Stanford

Running backs
 Anthony Davis, USC
 Kermit Johnson, UCLA

Wide receivers
 Lynn Swann, USC
 Bill Singler, Stanford

Tight ends
 Russ Francis, Oregon
 Jim Obradovich, USC

Tackles
 Booker Brown, USC
 Ed Kezirian, UCLA

Guards
 Steve Klosterman, UCLA
 Steve Ostermann, Washington State

Centers
 Geoff Reece, Washington State

Defensive selections

Defensive ends
 Fred McNeill, UCLA
 Roger Stilwell, Stanford

Defensive tackles
 Reggie Lewis, Oregon

Middle guard
 Monte Doris, USC

Linebackers
 Fulton Kuykendall, UCLA
 Tom Poe, Washington State
 James Sims, USC
 Richard Wood, USC

Defensive backs
 Jim Bright, UCLA
 Steve Donnelly, Oregon (safety)
 Jimmy Johnson, UCLA
 Artimus Parker, USC (safety)
 Randy Poltl, Stanford

Special teams

Placekicker
 Rod Garcia, Stanford

Punter
 Skip Boyd, Washington

Key

See also
1973 College Football All-America Team

References

All-Pacific-8 Conference Football Team
All-Pac-12 Conference football teams